Merycomyia whitneyi is a species of deer flies in the family Tabanidae. Larvae are known as sandworms and can be used as fish bait.

Distribution
Canada, United States

References

Tabanidae
Diptera of North America
Taxa named by Charles Willison Johnson
Insects described in 1904